S. debile  may refer to:
 Sedum debile, the orpine stonecrop or weakstem stonecrop, a low growing carpet forming flowering plant species
 Stylidium debile, the frail triggerplant, a carnivorous dicotyledonous plant endemic to coastal areas in Queensland and New South Wales, Australia

See also
 Debile (disambiguation)